The candle dance (Jawi: تاري ليلين) is an Indonesian dance performed by a group of dancers to the accompaniment of a group of musicians. The dancers carry lit candles on plates held on the palm of each hand. The dancers dance in groups, rotating the plates carefully so that the plate is always horizontal, and the candles are not extinguished. The dance is said to have originated in Sumatra, Indonesia.

History
The origin of this dance is inseparable from folklore.  In the folklore told in ancient times there was a girl who was left by her fiancé to go trading.  One day the girl lost her engagement ring, then she searched for it until late at night by using a candle placed on a plate.  In her search for the ring, the girl must intensify the trip to the yard, and she must bend to illuminate the ground and sometimes the girl's movements look like they are twisting and turning so they look like beautiful dance moves.  It was from here that this Candle Dance was born and began to be known among the village girls.

Function
The function of the Candles Dance is only for traditional events, namely to convey gratitude to God for the results and win that the community gets.  Along with the times, the function of Dance Candles are now not only support for traditional events, but also as arts and entertainment.

Candle Dance in the show
Candle Dance is usually enjoyed by a group of female dancers.  But there are also some male and female dancers in pairs.  In the show, the dancers dance with small plates and burning candles placed in the palms of their hands. They danced to the music that accompanied them.

See also 

 Plate trick
 Pandanggo
 Anti-twister mechanism
 Tari Piring
 Pasambahan

References

Minangkabau dance
Dances of Malaysia